Judah ibn Shabbethai (Hebrew: יהודה בן שבתי) was a Jewish-Spanish poet of the end of the 12th century. He has been identified with the physician Judah b. Isaac of Barcelona, who is praised as a poet by Al-Ḥarizi (ch. 46), but he may also have lived at Burgos.

Judah was a master of the "mosaic" style, and skillfully applied Biblical and Talmudic phrases; his humor was spontaneous. He was the author of Milḥemet ha-Ḥokmah weha-'Osher and Minḥat Yehudah Sone ha-Nashim. The former work (called also Melek Rab) is in the style of the "maḳamah," in rimed prose interspersed with short poems. It was written in 1214, and is addressed to the nasi Todros ha-Levi Abulafia, who is called upon, at the end of the work, to act as judge in a poetical dispute. It appeared at Constantinople in or around 1543, and was probably printed for the last time as an appendix to Abraham ben Ḥasdai's Ben ha-Melek weha-Nazir (Warsaw, 1894).

Minḥat Yehudah Sone ha-Nashim (called also Sefer Zeraḥ or Taḥkemoni) likewise is written in the style of the maḳamah. It is a humorous satire on women, and is a much better piece of work than the Milḥemet. It was written in 1218. It was dedicated to Abraham al-Fakhkhar (ben ha-Yoẓer). Like the Milḥemet, it appears to have been first printed at Constantinople, in 1543, the last reprint being in Eliezer Ashkenazi's Ṭa'am Zeḳenim (Frankfort-on-the-Main, 1854).

Jewish Encyclopedia bibliography
Steinschneider, Cat. Bodl. col. 1369 et seq.

External links
Jewish Encyclopedia article for Judah ibn Shabbethai, written by Richard Gottheil and H. Brody

References

Medieval Jewish poets
Spanish poets
Year of death unknown
Year of birth unknown
12th-century Sephardi Jews
Spanish male poets